Anna Danes (born July 4, 1969) is an American jazz singer, songwriter, speaker, writer, and music event producer. Find Your Wings, her second album, a collection of jazz standards and original songs was released in 2016, and peaked at #22 on the jazz music Billboard charts and debuted on the iTunes jazz charts at number one.

Early life
Danes was born Olga Anna Dmochowska in Gdańsk, Poland, the daughter of parents, Bogulaw Dmochowski and Izabella Dmochowska (née Wysocka). Her father was a mechanical engineer and her mother, an art historian of Polish folk art.  In 1979, at 10 years old, Danes and her parents escaped (then-communist) Poland to Sweden. They later immigrated to Ottawa, Canada.  She earned her bachelor's degree at the University of Ottawa on a scholarship in ancient history and archaeology and graduated the University of Windsor with a law degree.

Music career

Danes' album, Find Your Wings (Album), released in 2016 on DLG Recordings, debuted on iTunes jazz albums at #1 and climbed the Billboard Charts, peaking at #22

She has performed The Star-Spangled Banner at events such as opening day at Del Mar Futurity, an American Thoroughbred horse race held at Del Mar Racetrack in Del Mar, California to an audience of 45,000 and at Pauley Pavillon at UCLA to an audience of 14,000.

Danes has been featured on The Today Show, KSBW-TV, and Good Morning Lalaland   and received favorable reviews in Broadway World, Jazzed Magazine, and The Jazz World as well as KSDS Jazz 88.3 and received favorable reviews in Broadway World, Jazzed Magazine, and The Jazz World. In a feature article in the Huffington Post, Danes shares her experiences in pursuing a music career as a former Stay at Home Mom, "In many ways, you need LESS to succeed than you think! #1 is perseverance. Most other things can be learned and acquired. But if there is a WILL, you will find a way — just stay with it! I THOUGHT I needed all this “stuff” and a team of people to be noticed in show business."

Writer and speaker
Danes is a two-time breast cancer survivor. She received her first diagnosis in 2016. "I am making my story public in order to demystify the disease more and to potentially help others. I am one of the lucky ones: my cancer was caught early." She writes motivational blogs such as, “Cancer Part 1: Vanity Saved My Life,” as she was diagnosed with breast cancer after an elective breast lift procedure revealed cancer cells in the removed breast tissue. 
 
Danes delivered a Tedx event talk, Find Your Wings, in Solana Beach, California on August 25, 2018.

Her speaking engagements cover topics such as escaping (then-communist) Poland and immigrating to Sweden, getting past the fear of a cancer diagnosis, leaving a long-term marriage into the unknown, listening to your body, and the power of positive thinking.  Danes has been a featured guest on podcasts such as the LOTL Radio Podcast The Zone

Acting career
Danes plays the role of Liriope in the 2018 film, Fatal Perfection, a film short which brings Greek Mythology to the American Revolution where Narcissus pays attention to only his beauty while the people fight for their freedom. The film won a Honorable Mention for Screenplay Short at the LA Film Awards in September, 2018. Danes was featured as a storyteller on Radio Theatre For Your Soul, sharing the inspiration behind her songwriting in 2017, which was later released as a docu-story in 2021.

Music event producer
Danes' music event production company, Anna Danes Presents, has produced private, charity, and corporate events for clients such as The San Diego Symphony, the Association of Fundraising Professionals, Neiman Marcus, and has created the concert series, Jazz on Cedros, in San Diego, California.

Discography
 "La Vie En Rose" (Single) - 2013
 Longing - 2014
 Find Your Wings - 2016
 "The Christmas Song" (duet with Richard Shetton) (Single) - 2017

References

External links 
 Anna Danes

1969 births
Living people
American jazz singers
American women jazz singers
American women songwriters
University of Ottawa alumni
University of Windsor alumni
21st-century American women
Polish expatriates in the United States